There is a small community of Nepalis in Pakistan who are mostly the citizens of Nepal and descendants of Gurkhas who served in the Sikh Khalsa Army as well as recent migrants from Nepal.

Migration history
After the Anglo–Nepalese War, some dissident Nepalese commanders and 200 troops joined the Punjab army and were warmly welcomed by Maharaja Ranjit Singh. Parts of the Nepali Army which had fought valiantly against Punjab were integrated into the Punjabi armed forces. These Punjabi troops of Nepali origin were stationed in Lahore. Their countrymen back in Nepal started calling them "Lahure", since they were working in Lahore. This is how the term Lahure originated.

Nepalese doctors and medical students have been coming to Pakistan in recent years for work and further education. Approximately, 70 Nepali students, including 40 doctors, are pursuing higher education in Punjab province alone. All together, more than 200 Nepalis are pursuing medical courses in Pakistan.

Notable people
 Balbhadra Kunwar - Captain in the Royal Nepali Army (Gorkhali Army)

See also
 Pakistanis in Nepal
 Nepal–Pakistan relations

References

External links
 Worldwide Nepalese Students' Organization (Pakistan)

Ethnic groups in Pakistan
Pakistan
Pakistan
Immigration to Pakistan
Nepal–Pakistan relations